Amethysphaerion is a genus of beetles in the family Cerambycidae, containing the following species:

 Amethysphaerion eximium Martins & Napp, 1992
 Amethysphaerion falsus Martins, 1995
 Amethysphaerion guarani Martins & Napp, 1992
 Amethysphaerion jocosum Martins & Napp, 1992
 Amethysphaerion nigripes Martins & Monné, 1975
 Amethysphaerion submetallicum Martins & Napp, 1992
 Amethysphaerion trinidadensis (Gilmour, 1963)
 Amethysphaerion tuna Martins, 2005

References

Elaphidiini